This is a short bibliography of major works on the History of British Columbia.

Surveys

  Barman, Jean. The West Beyond the West: A History of British Columbia U. of Toronto Press, 1991. 430pp
 Francis, Daniel, ed. Encyclopedia of British Columbia. Madeira Park, B.C.: Harbour, 2000. 806 pp.
 Griffin, Harold. Radical Roots: The Shaping of British Columbia. Vancouver: Commonwealth Fund, 1999.
 Johnston, Hugh, ed. The Pacific Province: A History of British Columbia. (Douglas & McIntyre, 1996). 352 pp.
 McGillivray, Brett. Geography of British Columbia: People and Landscapes in Transition (U. of British Columbia Press, 2000). 235pp
 Ormsby, Margaret A. British Columbia: A History (Macmillan, 1958)  online edition
 Recksten, Terry. The Illustrated History of British Columbia. Vancouver: Douglas & McIntyre, 2001. 280 pp.
 Woodcock, George. British Columbia: A History of the Province. Vancouver: Douglas & McIntyre, 1990. 288 pp.
 Walbran, Captain John T. British Columbia Coast Names: 1592–1906 Their Origin and History. Vancouver. Douglas & McIntyre. 1971.

Prehistory and First Nations

 Boas, Franz Kwakiutl Ethnography. Chicago. University of Chicago Press. 1966.
 Cannon, Aubrey The Economic Prehistory of Namu. Burnaby, BC; Archaeology Press. 1991
Carlson, Roy L. and Bona, Luke Dalla, eds. Early Human Occupation in British Columbia. Vancouver: U. of British Columbia Press, 1996. 261 pp.
 McDowell, Jim. Hamatsa: The Enigma of Cannibalism on the Pacific Northwest Coast. Vancouver: Ronsdale, 1997. 297 pp.
 Muckle, Robert J. The First Nations of British Columbia. Vancouver: U. of British Columbia Press, 1998. 146pp.
Stewart, Hilary Looking at Indian Art of the Northwest Coast. Vancouver. Douglas & McIntyre. 1979. 
Suttles, Wayne, ed. Handbook of North American Indians: Volume 7 Northwest Coast. Washington. Smithsonian Institution. 1990. 
Turner, Nancy J. Plant Technology of First Peoples in British Columbia. Vancouver; UBC Press, 1998.

Empire and Settlement and pre-1871

 Bancroft, Hubert Howe. History of British Columbia (1887) online
 Harris, Cole. The Resettlement of British Columbia: Essays on Colonialism and Geographical Change. (U. of British Columbia Press, 1997). 314 pp.
 Hayes, Derek. Historical Atlas of British Columbia and the Pacific Northwest: Maps of Exploration. Vancouver: Cavendish, 1999. 208 pp.
 Loo, Tina. Making Law, Order, and Authority in British Columbia, 1821–1871.  (U. of Toronto Press, 1994). 239 pp.
 Sterne, Netta. Fraser Gold, 1858! The Founding of British Columbia. (Washington State U. Press, 1998). 187 pp.
Thomas, Edward Harper Chinook: A History and Dictionary. Portland Ore. Bindfords & Mort. 1935.

Colonization and First Nations
 Brody, Hugh Maps and Dreams: Indians and the British Columbia Frontier. Vancouver. Douglas & McIntyre. 1981. 
 Cole, Douglas & Ira Chaiken. An Iron Hand Upon the People: The Law Against the Potlatch on the Northwest Coast. Vancouver/Toronto. Douglas &McIntyre. 1990.
Harkin, Michael E. The Heiltsuks: Dialogues of Culture and History on the Northwest Coast. Lincoln. University of Nebraska Press. 1997.
 Harris, Douglas C. Fish, Law, and Colonialism: The Legal Capture of Salmon in British Columbia. Toronto. University of Toronto Press. 2001. 
Newell, Diane Tangled Webs of History: Indians and the Law in Canada's Pacific Coast Fisheries.  Toronto. University of Toronto Press. 1993.

Economics, business and labour

 Battien, Pauline. The Gold Seekers: A Two Hundred-Year History of Mining in Washington, Idaho, Montana and Lower British Columbia. Fairfield, Wash.: Ye Galleon, 1989. 265 pp.
 BC Hydro Power Pioneers. Gaslights to Gigawatts: A Human History of BC Hydro and its Predecessor. Vancouver: Hurricane, 1998. 236 pp.
 Drushka, Ken. Tie Hackers to Timber Harvesters: The History of Logging in the BC Interior. Madeira Park, B.C.: Harbour, 1998. 200 pp.
 Drushka, Ken. Working in the Woods: A History of Logging on the West Coast. Madeira Park, B.C.: Harbour, 1992. 304 pp.
 Mackie, Richard Somerset. Trading Beyond the Mountains: The British Fur Trade on the Pacific, 1793–1843. Vancouver: U. of British Columbia Press, 1997. 420 pp.
 Hak, Gordon. Turning Trees into Dollars: The British Columbia Coastal Lumber Industry, 1858–1913. U. of Toronto Press, 2000. 239 pp.
 Kesselman, Amy. Fleeting Opportunities: Women Shipyard Workers in Portland and Vancouver during World War II and Reconversion. Albany: State U. of New York Press, 1990. 192 pp.
 Knight, Rolf. Indians at Work: An Informal History of Native Indian Labour in British Columbia 1858–1930. Vancouver. New Star Books. 1978.
 Leonard, Frank. A Thousand Blunders: The Grand Trunk Pacific Railway and Northern British Columbia. Vancouver: U. of British Columbia Press, 1996. 344pp.

Environment and geography

 Cail Robert E. Land, Man and the Law: The Disposal of Crown Lands in British Columbia, 1871–1913 (U. of British Columbia Press, 1974) 
 Cannings Richard, and Sydney Cannings. British Columbia: A Natural History (Vancouver: Greystone Books 1996) 
 Day, J. C., and Richard Stace-Smith, eds. British Columbia Land For Wildlife: Past, Present, Future (Victoria: Ministry of Environment, Fish and Wildlife Branch, 1982)
 McGillivray, Brett. Geography of British Columbia: People and Landscapes in Transition (U. of British Columbia Press, 2000). 235pp
 Wilson, Jeremy. Talk and Log: Wilderness Politics in British Columbia, 1965-96 (University of British Columbia Press, 1998) online edition

Political

 Carty, R. K., ed. Politics, Policy, and Government in British Columbia. (U. of British Columbia Press, 1996). 381 pp.
 Clayton, Daniel W. Islands of Truth: The Imperial Fashioning of Vancouver Island. U. of British Columbia Press, 2000. 330 pp.
 Mitchell, David J. Succession: The Political Reshaping of British Columbia. Vancouver: Douglas & McIntyre, 1987. 201 pp.
 Resnick, Philip. The Politics of Resentment: British Columbia Regionalism and Canadian Unity. Vancouver: U. of British Columbia Press, 2000. 172pp
 Verchere, David R. A Progression of Judges: A History of the Supreme Court of British Columbia. Vancouver: U. of British Columbia Press, 1988. 196pp.

Regional and cities

 Davis, Chuck, ed. The Greater Vancouver Book: An Urban Encyclopedia. Vancouver: Linkman, 1997. 882 pp.
 Dunford, Muriel Poulton. North River: The Story of BC's North Thompson Valley and Yellowhead Highway 5. Merritt, B.C.: Sonotek, 2000. 384 pp.
 Furniss, Elizabeth. The Burden of History: Colonialism and the Frontier Myth in a Rural Canadian Community. Vancouver: U. of British Columbia Press, 1999. 237 pp.
 Leonard, David W. Delayed Frontier: The Peace River Country to 1909. Calgary, Alta.: Detselig, 1995. 256 pp.
 Sandwell, R. W., ed. Beyond the City Limits: Rural History in British Columbia. Vancouver: U. of British Columbia Press., 1999. 293pp.
 Wynn, Graeme and Oke, Timothy, eds.  Vancouver and Its Region. Vancouver: U. of British Columbia Press, 1992. 333pp.

Society, gender, race

 Belshaw John Douglas. Becoming British Columbia: A Population History (UBC Press 2009)
 Boschma, Geertje. "Deinstitutionalization reconsidered: geographic and demographic changes in mental health care in British Columbia and Alberta, 1950-1980." Histoire sociale/Social history 44.2 (2011): 223-256 online.
 Creese, Gillian and Strong-Boag, Veronica, eds. British Columbia Reconsidered: Essays on Women. Vancouver: Press Gang; U. of British Columbia, Center for Research in Women's Studies and Gender Relations, 1992. 454 pp.
 Kesselman, Amy. Fleeting Opportunities: Women Shipyard Workers in Portland and Vancouver during World War II and Reconversion. Albany: State U. of New York Press, 1990. 192 pp.
 Norris, John. Strangers Entertained: A History of Ethnic Groups in British Columbia. Vancouver: Evergreen Press, 1971. 254 pp.
 Perry, Adele. On the Edge of Empire: Gender, Race, and the Making of British Columbia, 1849–1871. (U. of Toronto Press, 2001). 360 pp.
 Roy, Patricia E. A White Man's Province: British Columbia Politicians and Chinese and Japanese Immigrants, 1858–1914. (U. of British Columbia Press, 1989). 327pp.
 Roy, Patricia; Granatstein, J. L.; Iino, Masaka; and Takamura, Hiroko. Mutual Hostages: Canadian and Japanese during the Second World War. (U. of Toronto Press, 1990). 282 pp.
 Sandwell, R.W. ed. Beyond the City Limits: Rural History in British Columbia (UNC Press, 1998), 304 pp online
Thomas, Edward Harper. Chinook: A History and Dictionary. Portland, Ore. Bin fords & Mort. 1935.

Culture and arts

  Barman, Jean; Sutherland, Neil; and Wilson, J.  Donald, eds. Children, Teachers and Schools in the History of  British Columbia.  Calgary, Alta.: Detselig, 1995. 426 pp.
 Burkinshaw, Robert K. Pilgrims in Lotus Land: Conservative Protestantism in British Columbia, 1917–1981. Montreal: McGill-Queen's U. Press, 1995. 353 pp.
 Christophers, Brett. Positioning the Missionary: John Booth Good and the Confluence of Cultures in Nineteenth-Century British Columbia.  Vancouver: U. of British Columbia Press, 1998. 200pp.
 Fleming, Thomas, ed. School Leadership: Essays on the British Columbia Experience, 1872–1995. Mill Bay, BC: Bendall, 2001. 427 pp.
Inverarity, Robert Bruce Art of the Northwest Coast Indians. Berkeley. University of California Press. 1950. 
Jensen, Doreen & Polly Sargent Robes of Power: Totem Poles on Cloth. Vancouver. University of British Columbia Press. 1986. 
 McIntosh, Dale. History of Music in British Columbia, 1850–1950. Victoria, B.C.: Sono Nis, 1989. 296 pp.
Samuels, Cheryl The Raven's Tail. Vancouver. University of British Columbia Press. 1987. 
Wilson, Lyle Paint: The Painted Works of Lyle Wilson. Maple Ridge Pitt Meadows Arts Council. Maple Ridge, BC. 2012.

Historiography
   Leir, Mark, 'W[h]ither Labour History? Regionalism, Class and the Writing of BC History'; Bryan Palmer, 'Class and the Writing of History: Beyond BC'; Veronica Strong-Boag, 'Moving Beyond Tired Truths: Or, Let's Not Fight the Old Battles'; Robert A. J. McDonald, 'The West is a Messy Place'; and Mark Leir, "Response to Professors Palmer, Strong-Boag, and McDonald" in BC Studies 111 (Autumn 1996): 61–98. 
 Reimer, Chad. Writing British Columbia History, 1784–1958 (2009), 206pp

Primary sources

 Hazlitt, William Carew. British Columbia and Vancouver Island (1858), described by Reimer (2009) as part imperial history, part promotional literature. 
 Mayne, Richard. Four Years in British Columbia and Vancouver Island (1862)

See also

Bibliography of Canada
Bibliography of Canadian history
Bibliography of Nova Scotia
Bibliography of Saskatchewan history
Bibliography of Alberta history
Bibliography of the 1837-1838 insurrections in Lower Canada
List of books about the War of 1812

 
British Columbia